Masked Marvel is a British Thoroughbred racehorse best known for winning the 2011 St. Leger Stakes.

Background
Masked Marvel was sired by Montjeu out of the German mare Waldmark. He is closely related to the 2011 Deutsches Derby winner Waldpark. He was trained throughout his career in Europe by John Gosden at Newmarket, Suffolk.

He was bred by the Hertfordshire-based Newsells Park Stud, and was sent as a yearling at Deauville Sales in August 2009 where he was sold for €260,000 to Jeremy Brummitt, the racing manager of Bjorn Nielsen.

Racing career

2010: two-year-old season
Masked Marvel began his career by winning a maiden race at Sandown, staying on strongly to lead close home and win by two lengths. He was immediately stepped up into Group race company, finishing sixth to Abjer in the Autumn Stakes at Ascot.

2011: three-year-old season
He began his three-year-old season by finishing fifth in the Sandown Classic Trial behind Genius Beast. Gosden later said that the colt was unsuited by the "tacky" ground. Masked Marvel then moved into Classic contention by beating Namibian by three lengths in the Cocked Hat Stakes, after which he was offered at 33–1 for the Derby. His trainer spoke positively of the colt, saying that, "he stays well and I like the way he quickened".

In the Derby he failed to cope with Epsom - Gosden described him as being "confused" by the course- and finished eighth of the thirteen runners, beaten just under nine lengths by Pour Moi. A month later, Masked Marvel re-appeared in the Bahrain Trophy at Newmarket, where he held off Census by a head in a tight finish to record his first Group race win. Despite the closeness of the finish, his rider Jimmy Fortune felt that the colt had more in reserve and was just "idling" in front. He was then rested and did not run again for ten weeks.

The St Leger was run at an unusually strong pace, making it a thorough test of stamina. Masked Marvel passed the Ballydoyle contender Seville two furlongs from home, opened up a clear lead, and stayed on strongly to win by three lengths from Brown Panther and Sea Moon in a race record time of 3:00.44. His rider, William Buick, who had been suspended for the colt's run at Newmarket, reported that Masked Marvel finished so well that he had difficulty pulling up. By a notable coincidence, the Gosden stable won the Irish St Leger less than an hour later when their gelding, Duncan dead-heated with Jukebox Jury at the Curragh

On 29 September Masked Marvel was a supplementary entry to the Prix de l'Arc de Triomphe for a fee of €100,000. The race had been the target for his stable companion Nathaniel who was withdrawn because of the firm ground at Longchamp. In the race, Masked Marvel raced prominently, but faded in the straight and finished last of the sixteen runners behind Danedream.

2012: four-year-old season
Masked Marvel began his four-year-old season in the Jockey Club Stakes at Newmarket. He led in the early stages but faded in the straight and finished seventh of the eight runners behind Al Kazeem. At Epsom on 2 June he finished third behind St Nicholas Abbey in the Coronation Cup. His form then deteriorated as he finished unplaced in the King George VI and Queen Elizabeth Stakes, Geoffrey Freer Stakes and Doncaster Cup.

2013/2014: four-year-old season
Masked Marvel was sold and exported to race in Australia. On his debut for his new connections he finished last in the Makybe Diva Stakes at Flemington Racecourse in September.

Race record

Pedigree

References

2008 racehorse births
Racehorses bred in the United Kingdom
Racehorses trained in the United Kingdom
Thoroughbred family 5-h
St Leger winners